Originally a separate village, Halswell is now a residential suburb of Christchurch, New Zealand, located  southwest of Cathedral Square on State Highway 75.

History
Halswell is named after Edmund Halswell QC (1790–1874), a government officer and member of the management commission of the Canterbury Association. He arrived in New Zealand in 1841 and was appointed Commissioner of Native Reserves.

Overview
Until fairly recently, Halswell was completely separated from the city geographically. In the 1960s the suburb of Oaklands was established to the north of the original Halswell village, and this expanded further when Westlake was developed in the late 1980s. The subdivision of Aidanfield in the 1990s effectively joined Halswell to the Christchurch urban area. 

The Rocks subdivision was established at the top of Kennedy's Bush Road, which is situated on the Port Hills, while the rest of Halswell sits on the flat ground of the Canterbury Plains.

Since the Christchurch earthquakes of 2011, the Halswell area has been growing rapidly, with subdivisions now extending in all directions. Longhurst and Knights Stream have been developed to the west, with amenities such as a medical centre, kindergarten and shopping hub.

Halswell has a public swimming pool, library, community hub, Catholic, Anglican, and United churches, and a post office with Kiwibank. The Halswell Quarry Park is a  family orientated park maintained by the Christchurch City Council. The park features all weather walking tracks, a mountain bike track, dog and horse exercise areas as well as native and exotic planted areas. Although named for this suburb, the quarry is located in the adjacent suburb Kennedys Bush.

Halswell Domain is a park in the centre of Halswell.  It includes a boating pond and a miniature railway, which runs on Sunday afternoons. On the edge of Halswell Domain is the Halswell War Memorial, unveiled in 1924 by Sir Heaton Rhodes MP.

The Nottingham Stream flows through the suburb and joins the Halswell River.

Demographics

Halswell had a population of 8,139 at the 2018 New Zealand census, an increase of 3,693 people (83.1%) since the 2013 census, and an increase of 3,990 people (96.2%) since the 2006 census. There were 2,868 households. There were 3,975 males and 4,167 females, giving a sex ratio of 0.95 males per female, with 1,671 people (20.5%) aged under 15 years, 1,539 (18.9%) aged 15 to 29, 3,885 (47.7%) aged 30 to 64, and 1,047 (12.9%) aged 65 or older.

Ethnicities were 79.0% European/Pākehā, 5.7% Māori, 2.0% Pacific peoples, 17.4% Asian, and 2.8% other ethnicities (totals add to more than 100% since people could identify with multiple ethnicities).

The proportion of people born overseas was 26.9%, compared with 27.1% nationally.

Although some people objected to giving their religion, 51.2% had no religion, 37.4% were Christian, 2.0% were Hindu, 1.3% were Muslim, 0.8% were Buddhist and 2.3% had other religions.

Of those at least 15 years old, 1,821 (28.2%) people had a bachelor or higher degree, and 831 (12.8%) people had no formal qualifications. The employment status of those at least 15 was that 3,741 (57.8%) people were employed full-time, 951 (14.7%) were part-time, and 165 (2.6%) were unemployed.

Education
Halswell School was established in 1864, and was rebuilt after the 2010 Christchurch earthquake. Oaklands School opened in the 1960s with the development of the new suburb. Knights Stream opened in 2019.

Seven Oaks School and Seven Oaks Secondary School are private schools sharing a campus and together providing education for years 1 to 13. The school started in 2009 and moved to the current site in 2017.

All these schools are coeducational. Rolls are as of

Notable residents
 Harry Ell (1862–1934), Member of Parliament and promoter of the Summit Road

References

External links
 360° Panorama of the Halswell Quarry Park – requires Java applet
 Halswell School
 Halswell Quarry Park
 Halswell Community
Halswell Project 2015, Christchurch City Libraries

Suburbs of Christchurch